Charles Demôle (March 22, 1828 – June 18, 1908) was a French politician of the French Third Republic. He was minister of public works (April 16, 1885 – January 6, 1886) in the government of Henri Brisson. He was minister of justice (January 7–December 10, 1886) in the government of Charles de Freycinet. He was a member of the Senate of France from January 5, 1879 until his death. He served twice as vice-president of the French Senate (1891–1895, 1898–1902).

Sources 
 

1828 births
1908 deaths
People of the French Third Republic
Vice-presidents of the Senate (France)